Anna-Marie "Bunny" Bruning (born September 5, 1957) is an American former professional tennis player.

Bruning grew up in California and was active on the WTA Tour during the 1970s and 1980s. She competed in the main draws of all four grand slam tournaments and was runner-up in the Wimbledon Plate in 1976.

Now a resident of Adel, Iowa, Bruning has worked in the region as a tennis coach since leaving professional tennis and is currently Tennis Director of the Wakonda Club in Des Moines.

WTA Tour finals

Doubles (0–2)

References

External links
 
 

1957 births
Living people
American female tennis players
Tennis people from California